The Cumberland County Courthouse, located in Courthouse Square in Toledo, is the county courthouse of Cumberland County, Illinois. Built in 1887–88, the building is Cumberland County's second courthouse. The first courthouse, located at the same site as the current one, was built in 1856 and burned in 1885. The second courthouse was designed by architects S. S. Goehring and L.L. Pierson. The building's design features a central clock tower, arched entrances on the east and west sides, column-supported balconies above the entrances, and a balustrade along the roofline. The building has continuously served as the seat of county government since its opening.

The courthouse was added to the National Register of Historic Places on June 11, 1981.

Notes

Buildings and structures in Cumberland County, Illinois
County courthouses in Illinois
Clock towers in Illinois
Courthouses on the National Register of Historic Places in Illinois
Government buildings completed in 1888
National Register of Historic Places in Cumberland County, Illinois